Gramella lutea is a Gram-negative, aerobic, rod-shaped and non-motile bacterium from the genus of Gramella which has been isolated from marine sediments from Hwangwooji from the Jeju island.

References

Flavobacteria
Bacteria described in 2015